{{Infobox rail service
| name = Puri Shalimar Garib Rath Express
| image= 
| caption =
| type = Superfast Express, Garib Rath Express
| first = 5 January 2009   
| last =
| operator = East Central Railways
| ridership =
| start = Puri 
| stops = 7
| end = Shalimar railway station
| distance =    
| journeytime = 8 hours 50 minutes as 12882 Puri Shalimar Garib Rath Express, 9 hours 00 minutes as 12881 Puri Garib Rath Express.       
| frequency = 2 days a week. 12882 Puri Shalimar Garib Rath Express – Monday & Wednesday. 12881 Shalimar Puri Garib Rath Express – Tuesday & Thursday.
| class = AC 3 tier
| seating = No
| sleeping = Yes
| autorack = No
| catering = No  
| observation = Rake Sharing with 22883/84 Puri−Yesvantpur Garib Rath Express
| entertainment =
| baggage = Storage space under berth 
| other facilities = 
| stock = ICF Garib Rath Coaches
| gauge = 
| electrification = Yes
| train number = 12882 / 12881
| speed =  maximum ,, including halts

The 12882 / 81 Puri Shalimar Garib Rath Express is a Superfast Express train of the Garib Rath series belonging to Indian Railways - East Coast Railway zone that runs between Puri and Shalimar in India.

It operates as train number 12882 from Puri to Shalimar  and as train number 12881 in the reverse direction serving the states of West Bengal & Odisha.

It is part of the Garib Rath Express series launched by the former railway minister of India, Mr. Laloo Prasad Yadav

Coaches

The 12882 / 81 Puri Shalimar Garib Rath Express has 16 AC 3 tier & 2 End on Generator Coaches. It does not carry a Pantry car coach  .

As is customary with most train services in India, Coach Composition may be amended at the discretion of Indian Railways depending on demand.

Service

As the average speed of the train is above , as per Indian Railways rules, its fare includes a superfast surcharge.

Routeing

The 12882 / 81 Puri Shalimar Garib Rath Express runs from Puri via Bhubaneswar, Cuttack, Bhadrak, Kharagpur Junction to Shalimar.

Traction

As the route is fully electrified, a Visakhapatnam based WAP-4 or WAP-7 powers the train for its entire journey .

Operation

12882 Puri Shalimar Garib Rath Express leaves Puri every Monday & Wednesday arriving Shalimar the next day.
 
12881 Shalimar Puri Garib Rath Express leaves  Shalimar  every Tuesday & Thursday arriving Puri the next day.

References 

 http://www.indianrail.gov.in/garibrath_trn_list.html
 http://news.oneindia.in/2008/06/28/puri-howrah-garib-rath-among-eight-new-trains-to-run-in-ecor-1214677975.html
 https://www.youtube.com/watch?v=a1iz5cg_Mcg
 http://news.webindia123.com/news/Articles/India/20140606/2404653.html
 http://www.merinews.com/newPhotoLanding.jsp?imageID=10062
 http://www.thehindu.com/todays-paper/tp-national/tp-otherstates/railways-seeks-free-land-for-linking-konark/article368118.ece

External links

Trains from Howrah Junction railway station
Transport in Puri
Rail transport in Howrah
Garib Rath Express trains
Rail transport in Odisha
Rail transport in West Bengal
Railway services introduced in 2009